R. indica may refer to:
 Raoiella indica, the red palm mite, a mite species
 Ratufa indica, the Indian giant squirrel or Malabar giant squirrel, a large-bodied diurnal, arboreal and herbivorous squirrel species
 Reticulosphaeria indica, a fungus species
 Rhaphiolepis indica, the Indian hawthorn, an evergreen shrub species

See also
 Indica (disambiguation)